Donald Sutherland,  (April 8, 1863 – January 1, 1949) was a Canadian politician.

Born in Zorra Township, Canada West, he was first ran for the House of Commons of Canada in the riding of Oxford South in the 1908 federal election. He was defeated but was elected in the 1911 federal election. A Conservative, he was re-elected in 1917, 1921, and 1925. He was defeated in 1926, 1930, and in a 1934 by-election. In 1926, he was a Minister without Portfolio in the short lived cabinet of Arthur Meighen. In 1935, he was called to the Senate of Canada to represent the senatorial division of Oxford, Ontario. He died while in office in 1949.

References
 
 

1863 births
1949 deaths
Canadian senators from Ontario
Conservative Party of Canada (1867–1942) MPs
Conservative Party of Canada (1867–1942) senators
Members of the House of Commons of Canada from Ontario
Members of the King's Privy Council for Canada
Progressive Conservative Party of Canada senators